The church of Saint Lucia is a place of Catholic worship in Rome, seat of the parish belonging to the diocese of Rome and, since 1973 the cardinal's title of "Saint Lucia at the Yard." 

The building is located in the stretch of the ring road Clodia between Piazzale Clodius and Marshal Square Garden, in Della Vittoria district falling within the boundaries of the Municipality of Rome I.

List of Cardinal Protectors
 Timothy Manning 5 March 1973 - 23 June 1989
 Frédéric Etsou-Nzabi-Bamungwabi 28 June 1991 - 6 January 2007
 Theodore Adrien Sarr 24 November 2007 - present

References
 Santa Lucia

Titular churches
Rome Q. XV Della Vittoria
Roman Catholic churches completed in 1938
20th-century Roman Catholic church buildings in Italy